Momigi (foaled 1972 in Ontario) was a Canadian three-time Champion Thoroughbred racehorse.

Background
Momigi was bred by E. P. Taylor at his Windfields Farm in Oshawa, Ontario. She was sold to Japanese veterinarian Koichiro Hayata whose Hayata Farm would later breed 1996 Japanese Triple Crown winner and Horse of the Year, Narita Brian.

Trained by John Morahan, Momigi was based at Toronto's Woodbine Racetrack.

Racing career
At age two, the colt's best result was a third in the Natalma Stakes then at age three she won the Duchess and Wonder Where Stakes and ended L'Enjoleur's hope's for a Canadian Triple Crown when she beat her male counterparts to win the third leg on turf, the Breeders' Stakes. Momigi's performances earned her 1975 Canadian Champion 3-Year-Old Filly honours.

In 1976, the then four-year-old Momigi earned  Canadian Champion Older Female Horse honours and in 1977, at a time when there was no distinction between males and females, she was voted the Canadian Champion Turf Horse.

Breeding record
Retired from racing, owner Koichiro Hayata brought Momigi to Japan to serve as a broodmare for his fledgling breeding operation.

References

 Momigi's pedigree and partial racing stats

1972 racehorse births
Racehorses bred in Ontario
Racehorses trained in Canada
Sovereign Award winners
Thoroughbred family 9-h